Choliambic verse, also known as limping iambs or scazons or halting iambic, is a form of meter in poetry. It is found in both Greek and Latin poetry in the classical period. Choliambic verse is sometimes called scazon, or "lame iambic", because it brings the reader down on the wrong "foot" by reversing the stresses of the last few beats.  It was originally pioneered by the Greek lyric poet Hipponax, who wrote "lame trochaics" as well as "lame iambics".

The basic structure is much like iambic trimeter, except that the last cretic is made heavy by the insertion of a longum instead of a breve. Also, the third anceps of the iambic trimeter line must be short in limping iambs. In other words, the line scans as follows (where — is a long syllable, u is a short syllable, and x is an anceps):

x — u — | x — u — | u — — —

As in all classical verse forms, the phenomenon of brevis in longo is observed, so the last syllable can actually be short or long.

The Roman poet Catullus' poems 8, 22 and 39 serve as examples of choliambic verse.

See also
Prosody (Latin)

Notes

References
 .
 .
 .
 .

Types of verses
Latin poetry
Greek poetry
Latin-language literature